Hopnomkoyo is a former Maidu settlement in Plumas County, California.

References

Former populated places in California
Former settlements in Plumas County, California
Maidu villages